Eddie Foy III (February 10, 1935 – November 3, 2018) was an American casting director and actor. He was director of casting for ABC and vice president of casting for NBC.

Foy completed his career as a longstanding independent casting director and talent executive for The Jerry Lewis MDA Labor Day Telethon. For his contributions to the advancement of television casting, he was honored by the Academy of Television Arts & Sciences.

Early years 
Born in New York City, Foy was the son of Eddie Foy Jr. and Anna Marie McKenny Foy. He was the grandson of Eddie Foy Sr. He attended Riverdale Country School.

Foy debuted on stage at age 10 in a revival of The Red Mill on Broadway.

Eddie Foy was an officer in the California Army National Guard.  He was commissioned a Second Lt on 21 July 1962 at Camp San Luis Obispo after completing the one year Officer Candidate School. He was assigned to Company A, 240th Signal Battalion.

Career 
After a brief foray into acting, Foy became a casting director and over a 42-year period was involved in casting some of the most popular television shows of the era, including The Donna Reed Show, Naked City, Dennis the Menace, Route 66, Straightaway, The Farmer's Daughter, Gidget, I Dream of Jeannie, The Monkees, The Flying Nun, That Girl, Julia, Room 222, Happy Days, Soap, Hill Street Blues, Charlie's Angels, Mork & Mindy, and Barney Miller, as well as TV movies and miniseries such as Roots and Shōgun, and feature films, including Planet of the Apes and The Great White Hope.

Personal life 
On September 16, 1995, Foy married Jan Standley in Sherman Oaks, California.

Foy died on November 3, 2018, after a fall at his home in Denison, Iowa.

Filmography

References

External links

Eddie Foy III interview - A five-hour Television Academy interview, conducted in 2003.

1935 births
2018 deaths
20th-century American male actors
American male film actors
Male actors from New York City
American casting directors
American people of Irish descent
Riverdale Country School alumni